A  is a small device used in East Asian calligraphy as a container designed to hold a small amount of water. In order to make ink a few drops of water are dropped onto the surface of an inkstone. By grinding an inkstick into this water on the inkstone, particles come off and mix with the water, forming ink.

Water-droppers may be made of copper, jade or other stone, or ceramic. A water-dropper has two small holes for water and air, and is designed so that only a few drops of water can fall at one time.

There are a few types of water-droppers.

References

External links 

 Fish shaped water dropper at the Art Gallery of New South Wales
Water droppers at the University of Michigan Museum of Art
Water droppers at the British Museum
"Object of the Week: Rat water dropper" from the Seattle Museum of Art

Visual arts materials
Chinese calligraphy
Chinese inventions
Japanese calligraphy